The 31st United States Colored Infantry was an infantry regiment raised in New York State during the American Civil War that recruited black soldiers.

History
The Regiment was raised at Hart Island on 29 April 1864, and became active on 14 November 1864, in Virginia. The 30th Connecticut Colored Volunteers was amalgamated into it on 18 May 1864. The commanding officer was Colonel Henry C. Ward. Among the regiments recruits were Bermudians Robert Tappin (who had previously served in the United States Navy from 1863 to 1864), John Wilson and Joseph Thomas.

The Regiment was assigned successively to: the Middle Department (April, 1864); the 1st Brigade, 4th Division, 9th Corps, Army of the Potomac (April to November, 1864); the 1st Brigade, 1st Division, 25th Corps (November, 1864, to April, 1865); the 1st Brigade, 3rd Division, 10th Corps (April to August, 1865); and the District of New Berne, North Carolina, until it was demobilised on 7 November 1865, when its men mustered out.

From its becoming active in Virginia, it took part in the advance from the Rapidan River to the James River, then guarded trains through the Wilderness forest until June 1864. It took part in the Battle of Cold Harbor from the 2nd to the 12th of June. It took part in the sieges of Petersburg and Richmond from 16 June until 2 April. From November 1864 to March 1865, the Regiment took part in the Bermuda Hundred Campaign. It took part in the Battle of Appomattox Court House on 9 April 1865. From May to June 1865, it was assigned to the Department of Texas and posted on the Rio Grande.

The regiment lost: 2 officers and 35 enlisted men killed, 1 officer and 19 enlisted men died of wounds; 1 officer and 100 enlisted men to disease; 3 enlisted men by accidents; another 3 enlisted men drowned; 1 murdered; 1 enlisted man died of sunstroke; and 15 enlisted men died of unknown causes; 5 enlisted men died while prisoners of war.

See also
List of United States Colored Troops Civil War units

References

United States Colored Troops Civil War units and formations
Units and formations of the Union Army from New York (state)
Military units and formations disestablished in 1865
Military units and formations established in 1864
1864 establishments in New York (state)